The following is a list of current National Association of Intercollegiate Athletics (NAIA) schools that have participated in the playoffs (also known as the Championship Series) leading to the NAIA Football National Championship since 1956. The playoffs featured two teams in 1956, four teams from 1958, eight teams from 1978, and sixteen teams from 1987 until the present. A separate NAIA Division II Football National Championship was also held between 1970 and 1996, with the same number of teams competing in its annual playoffs.

Many of the teams who participated in past editions of the playoffs have subsequently joined the National Collegiate Athletic Association (NCAA) or disbanded their programs.

Current NAIA members
Updated as of the 2022 playoffs.

Former NAIA members

NCAA Division I FBS

NCAA Division I FCS

NCAA Division II

NCAA Division III

Discontinued programs

See also
 List of NAIA football programs
 NAIA Football National Championship
 List of NCAA Division I FBS football bowl records
 List of NCAA Division I FCS playoff appearances by team
 List of NCAA Division II Football Championship appearances by team
 List of NCAA Division III Football Championship appearances by team

References

Appearances
NAIA National Football Championship Series appearances by team